Los Reyes Del Nuevo Milenio (English: The Kings Of The New Millennium) is Wisin & Yandel's first album. It peaked at #35 on the Billboard Top Latin Albums chart.

Track listing

Charts

References

Wisin & Yandel albums
2000 albums